Electric Loco Shed, Bhilai is a motive power depot performing locomotive maintenance and repair facility for electric locomotives of the Indian Railways, located at Bhilai of the South East Central Railway zone in Chhattisgarh, India.

History

New Electric locomotive shed was inaugurated in the 1980s with WAM-4 class. All the WAM-4s of this shed have been retired/withdrawn from service.

Operations
Being one of the two electric loco sheds in South East Central Railway, various major and minor maintenance schedules of electric locomotives are carried out here. It has the sanctioned capacity of 175 engine units. Beyond the operating capacity, this shed houses a total of 299 engine units, including 55 WAP-7, 118 WAG-7 and 126 WAG-9. Like all locomotive sheds, BIA does regular maintenance, overhaul and repair including painting and washing of locomotives. BIA locomotives used to be predominantly the regular links for trains traveling to north and south as well.

Livery & markings
Bhilai WAP-7 locomotive has Goel TMT, GK TMT, Jindal Panther TMT and Shourya TMT advertisements on loco's body side.
Bhilai loco shed has its own stencils. It is written in Bold letters in both English and Hindi language.

Locomotives

References

External links

Transport in Bhilai
Bhilai
1970 establishments in Madhya Pradesh